Homer Louis "Boots" Randolph III (June 3, 1927 – July 3, 2007) was an American musician best known for his 1963 saxophone hit "Yakety Sax" (which became Benny Hill's signature tune). Randolph was a major part of the "Nashville sound" for most of his professional career.

Biography
Randolph was born in Paducah, Kentucky, United States, and raised in Cadiz, Kentucky, attending Central High School in Evansville, Indiana.

As a child, he learned to play music with his family's band. He was not sure where or why he acquired the nickname "Boots", although it may have served to avoid confusion since his father and he had the same first name. He started out playing the ukulele and trombone, but switched to tenor saxophone when his father unexpectedly brought one home.
 
At the end of World War II, Boots Randolph played saxophone, trombone, and vibraphone in the United States Army Band. After his service in the Army, he played with Dink Welch's Kopy Kats in Decatur, Illinois, from 1948 to 1954. He briefly resided in Louisville, Kentucky, before returning to Decatur to start his own group. He left Decatur in 1957.

During his forty-plus year career, Randolph performed in hundreds of venues alongside many artists in pop, rock, jazz, and country music. He played on many recording sessions with Elvis Presley and also performed on soundtracks for a number of Presley's motion pictures, one popular song being "Return to Sender".

Randolph recorded for Monument Records in Nashville and played on Roy Orbison's 1963 hit, "Mean Woman Blues." He was also featured on "Little Queenie" by REO Speedwagon, "Java" by Al Hirt, "Turn On Your Love Light" by Jerry Lee Lewis, and "Rockin' Around the Christmas Tree" by Brenda Lee. He was present on many recordings by guitarist Chet Atkins with whom he often performed. Early in his career, he often billed himself as Randy Randolph.

As a solo recording artist, Randolph placed four singles in the Top-100 between 1963 and 1967. The most successful of these was "Yakety Sax", which reached #35 in 1963 and stayed on the charts for nine weeks. Randolph was also successful on Billboard Magazine'''s album charts, having fourteen entries between 1963 and 1972. Boots With Strings from 1966 reached #36 and stayed on the chart for nearly two years.

In 1977, Randolph opened a successful club of his own in Nashville's Printer's Alley. He also frequently appeared on the television program Hee Haw, and was a member of the Million Dollar Band.

On July 3, 2007, Randolph died at Skyline Medical Center in Nashville, Tennessee, after suffering a brain hemorrhage. He had celebrated his 80th birthday just one month prior. He had a son, a daughter and four grandchildren.

His final solo studio album, A Whole New Ballgame, was released June 12, 2007.

Discography

Albums

 A "Boots with Strings" also peaked at #3 on Jazz albums and #21 on R&B albums.
 B "Country Boots" peaked at #30 on Country albums

Singles

See also
The Nashville A-Team

References
Trott, Walt. (1998). "Boots Randolph." In The Encyclopedia of Country Music''. Paul Kingsbury, Editor. New York: Oxford University Press. pp. 428–9.

Regeneration (Reunion of Nashville's A Team) (2003) 
- Sunset Records America - Producer, Neil J. Cacciottolo
https://open.spotify.com/artist/1IEpoveGWq3VizB1jFvMrA

External links
 Official Site
 
 Boots bio
 Some of his music
 Find-A-Grave Memorial Page
 Boots Randolph Interview NAMM Oral History Program (2003)

1927 births
2007 deaths
American rock saxophonists
American male saxophonists
American session musicians
Musicians from Paducah, Kentucky
RCA Victor artists
Monument Records artists
Capitol Records artists
Musicians from Evansville, Indiana
People from Trigg County, Kentucky
Million Dollar Band (country music group) members
20th-century American saxophonists
20th-century American male musicians
United States Army personnel of World War II
United States Army Band musicians